Carl Michael Sneep (born November 5, 1987) is an American former professional ice hockey defenseman. He played in one National Hockey League (NHL) game with the Pittsburgh Penguins during the 2011–12 season.

Playing career
Before attending Boston College, Sneep played for the Lincoln Stars of the USHL, based out of Lincoln, NE. He was selected by the Pittsburgh Penguins in the 2nd round (32nd overall) of the 2006 NHL Entry Draft. He played his first NHL game for the Penguins on December 17, 2011 against the Buffalo Sabres. He also recorded an assist, his first NHL point, during that game.

On January 24, 2013, Sneep was traded from the Penguins to the Dallas Stars in exchange for a conditional seventh round draft pick.

On April 9, 2013, Sneep was traded from the Texas Stars to the Peoria Rivermen for Brett Sonne. Both players are considered to be loaned and remain property of their respective clubs. With no contract offer extended by the Stars at the conclusion of the season, Sneep was released as a free agent.

On August 27, 2013, Sneep agreed to a one-year contract with ECHL club, the Idaho Steelheads. After thirteen games with the Steelheads, Sneep announced he was leaving the team with the intention of retiring from professional hockey. The Steelheads suspended Sneep indefinitely, which also secured his ECHL rights for the remainder of his contract. Sneep did not return to the Steelheads and is considered retired.

Career statistics

Awards and honors

See also
List of players who played only one game in the NHL

References

External links

1987 births
Living people
American men's ice hockey defensemen
Boston College Eagles men's ice hockey players
Ice hockey players from Minnesota
Idaho Steelheads (ECHL) players
People from Nisswa, Minnesota
Peoria Rivermen (AHL) players
Pittsburgh Penguins draft picks
Pittsburgh Penguins players
Texas Stars players
Wheeling Nailers players
Wilkes-Barre/Scranton Penguins players
Lincoln Stars players